Arisaema section Clavata is a section of the genus Arisaema.

Description
Plants in this section have tuberous underground stems with white interior and pedate leaves. Plant has auxiliary buds with accessory buds and sterile flowers on spadix appendages.

Distribution
Plants from this section are found from central China to japan.

Species
Arisaema section Clavata comprises the following species:

References

Plant sections